Lindel Hodge (born 5 April 1959, in Road Town, Tortola) is a sprinter from the British Virgin Islands.

Hodge was part of the first ever team to represent  British Virgin Islands at the Summer Olympics when he competed in the 1984 Summer Olympics, he entered the 200 metres and in his heat he ran a time of 22.28 seconds and finished 5th out of eight runners so didn't qualify for the next round, he also entered the 4x400 metres relay they finished 6th in the heat so didn't qualify for the next round. Four years later he was at the 1988 Summer Olympics and this time he ran in the 100 metres and 200 metres in the 100 metres he ran in a time of 10.79 seconds and finished 6th in his heat and the 200 metres he finished 5th so didn't qualify for the next round in either event.

References

1959 births
Living people
British Virgin Islands male sprinters
Athletes (track and field) at the 1984 Summer Olympics
Athletes (track and field) at the 1988 Summer Olympics
Olympic athletes of the British Virgin Islands
Athletes (track and field) at the 1987 Pan American Games
Athletes (track and field) at the 1991 Pan American Games
Athletes (track and field) at the 1990 Commonwealth Games
Commonwealth Games competitors for the British Virgin Islands
Pan American Games competitors for the British Virgin Islands